Windsor Gardens is a suburb in the north-eastern suburbs of Adelaide, the capital of South Australia.

A Windsor Gardens Post Office opened on 2 February 1954 but was replaced by the Greenacres office in 1963.

References

Suburbs of Adelaide